Sofiya Perovskaya is a 1967 Soviet biopic film directed by Lev Arnshtam. The film is based on the life of Sofiya Perovskaya, member of Narodnaya Volya, executed for taking part in planning the successful assassination of Alexander II of Russia.

Cast
 Alexandra Nazarova as Sofiya Perovskaya
 Viktor Tarasov as Andrei Zhelyabov
 Boris Khmelnitsky as Nikolai Kibalchich
 Georgi Taratorkin as Ignaty Grinevitsky
 Vladislav Strzhelchik as Alexander II of Russia
 Yefim Kopelyan as Mikhail Loris-Melikov

References

External links

1967 films
Mosfilm films
Soviet black-and-white films
Films directed by Lev Arnshtam
Films scored by Dmitri Shostakovich